Puerto Ricans have served as members of the United States Armed Forces and have fought in every major conflict in which the United States has been involved from World War I onward. Many Puerto Ricans, including those of Puerto Rican descent, have distinguished themselves during combat as members of the five branches of the U.S. Military, the Army, Marines, Navy, Air Force and the Coast Guard.

Nine Puerto Ricans have been awarded the United States' highest military decoration – the Medal of Honor, seven have been awarded the Navy Cross and nineteen have been awarded the Distinguished Service Cross (four of which were upgraded to the Medal of Honor on March 18, 2014.).

The Navy Cross is the second highest medal that can be awarded by the U.S. Navy and are awarded to members of the U.S. Navy or U.S. Marine Corps for heroism or distinguished service. The following is a list of the seven Puerto Ricans awarded the Navy Cross with their citations. On August 2, 1917, Lieutenant Frederick L. Riefkohl of the US Navy became the first known Puerto Rican to be awarded the Navy Cross.

World War I

Frederick Lois Riefkohl

Rear Admiral Frederick Lois Riefkohl U.S. Navy, retired (February 27, 1889 – September 1969), a native of Maunabo, Puerto Rico was the first Puerto Rican to graduate from the United States Naval Academy. He became the first Puerto Rican to be awarded the Navy Cross Medal when in World War I, Riefkohl as a lieutenant aboard the U.S.S. Philadelphia, was engaged in combat action against an enemy submarine.
Navy Cross Citation:

Postscript: Rear Admiral Frederick Lois Riefkohl served as Captain of the USS Vincennes during World War II.

2nd Nicaraguan Campaign

Rafel Toro
Private Rafel Toro* (died July 25, 1927), born in Humacao, Puerto Rico, was a member of the United States Marine Corps who served in the 2nd Nicaraguan Campaign during the Banana Wars He was posthumously awarded the Navy Cross.

Navy Cross Citation:

Postscript:
Toro was part of the U.S. Marine Corps occupation force in Nicaragua. On July 25, 1927, Private Toro was on advance guard duty into Nueva Segovia. As he rode into town, he was attacked; returning fire, he was able to hold back the enemy until reinforcements arrived. He was mortally wounded in this action for which he was posthumously awarded the Navy Cross. On May 28, 2007 — Memorial Day — Senator Kenneth McClintock, President of the Senate of Puerto Rico, along with Puerto Rico National Guard Adjutant General Colonel David Carrión, unveiled the names of Puerto Rican military heroes most recently added to "El Monumento de la Recordación" (the Monument of Remembrance).  Among those newly honored were Rafel Toro, Manuel Rivera Jr. and Medal of Honor recipient Humbert Roque Versace. The monument, which honors Puerto Rico's fallen military, is located in front of the  Capitol Building in San Juan, Puerto Rico.

Korean War

Ramón Núñez-Juárez

PFC. Ramón Núñez-Juárez* (October 6, 1932 – September 8, 1952), born in San Sebastián, Puerto Rico was a member of the United States Marine Corps. He was listed as Missing in Action during the Korean War and was posthumously awarded the Navy Cross.

Navy Cross Citation:

Núñez-Juárez was born in San Sebastián, Puerto Rico, where he received his primary and secondary education. In 1952, Núñez-Juárez was inducted into the Marines in San Juan, the island's capital, and reported to Marine Corps Recruit Depot Parris Island, South Carolina. After he graduated from his basic training, he was sent to Camp Lejeune in North Carolina where he underwent advanced training before being sent to Korea. He was assigned as an automatic rifleman to Company E of the 2nd Battalion, 1st Marines (2/1), 1st Marine Division.

The 1st Marine Division was stationed in the eastern part of Korea when in early spring of 1952 it was ordered to move to defend the western sector.

On August 8, 1952, E Company, 2/1, began taking incoming mortar and artillery rounds from the Communist Chinese Army's  63rd and 65th armies. A company-size Chinese Communist Force (CCF) struck Outpost Siberia, which was manned by PFC Ramón Núñez-Juárez and a squad of 15 men. Núñez-Juárez and the other the riflemen fought off the enemy for nearly half an hour before withdrawing from their position.

Núñez-Juárez, manning a Browning Automatic Rifle (BAR), was  able to halt the enemy's advance long enough for the remainder of his squad to escape. Núñez-Juárez was struck by enemy gunfire and died as a result of his wounds. For the next several days the Marines tried to retake Outpost Siberia, but were unable to do so. Núñez-Juárez was listed as Missing in Action and was posthumously awarded the Navy Cross for his heroic actions.

Postscript: PFC Ramón Núñez-Juárez's remains have never been recovered and a symbolic burial with full military honors was held on October 25, 1970.  There is a headstone with his name inscribed above an empty grave in the Puerto Rico National Cemetery, located in Bayamon, Puerto Rico. His name is inscribed in El Monumento de la Recordación, a monument dedicated to the Puerto Ricans who have fallen in combat, located in San Juan, Puerto Rico.

Enrique Romero-Nieves
PFC Enrique Romero-Nieves (died October 26, 1952) born in Culebra, Puerto Rico, was a member of the United States Marine Corps who served in the Korean War. He was posthumously awarded the Navy Cross.

Navy Cross Citation:

Postscript:

Vietnam War

Angel Mendez

Sergeant Angel Mendez* (August 8, 1946 – March 16, 1967), born in New York City, New York to Puerto Rican parents was a member of the United States Marine Corps that belonged to Company F, 2nd Battalion, 7th Marines, 1st Marine Division. Despite being mortally wounded, Sgt. Mendez, covered his platoon commander with his body and carried him to safety. He was posthumously awarded the Navy Cross.

Navy Cross Citation:

Mendez' parents were Antonio Méndez Pomales, a native of Fajardo and Martina Rivera García from Naguabo. They moved from Puerto Rico to New York City seeking a better life.  His father owned and attended a grocery store in the South Bronx while his mother cared for their eight children at home. When Mendez' mother became ill and the family's economic situation worsened, his father could not raise him and his siblings, therefore 2 were sent to foster homes and 6 were placed in the Mission of the Immaculate Virgin, an orphanage on Mount Loretto, Staten Island. There he received his primary and secondary education. Mendez was a member of the cadet corps along with his brothers and many of the "Mount" kids. At a young age, he became fascinated with military life and with his friends would often imagine that he was on a "patrol" while camping at Stokes State Forest and Worthington State Forest.

In 1964, he volunteered to join the Marine Corps right after graduating from high school. Mendez received his basic training at Marine Corps Recruit Depot Parris Island, South Carolina. After he graduated from his recruit training, he was sent to Marine Corps Base Camp Lejeune, North Carolina to attend the School of Infantry. Mendez was assigned to Delta Company, 1st Battalion, 26th Marine Regiment, 1st Marine Division.

Operation Desoto

Upon his deployment to South Vietnam, Mendez was assigned to Company F, 2nd Battalion, 7th Marines, 1st Marine Division.

Operation Desoto, was initiated on 27 January 1967 in the Đức Phổ District of Quảng Ngãi Province. The 2nd Battalion 7th Marines was part of the Special Landing Force (SLF) and took part in operations throughout the Marines Corps area of responsibility and saw extensive action throughout the 4-month-long operation. The 7th Marines, with elements of the 5th Marine Regiment, bore the brunt of most of the patrolling and contact with the enemy, whose presence continued in Chu Lai.

On March 16, 1967, Mendez was conducting a Search and destroy mission with his company when they came under attack from a Viet Cong battalion. Half of his platoon was pinned down in a rice paddy under enemy fire, and Mendez volunteered to lead a squad to assist the pinned-down Marines in returning to friendly lines with their two dead and two seriously wounded men. Mendez exposed himself while returning fire with his M79 grenade launcher on the enemy. His Platoon Commander, Lieutenant Ronald D. Castille was seriously wounded and he fell, unable to move. Using his own body, Mendez shielded Lt. Castille as he applied a dressing to the wound, he then picked up the Lieutenant and started to carry him to friendly lines, which were more than seventy-five meters away. Mendez was hit in the shoulder and two of his comrades rushed to help him with their commander, Mendez however refused to let go of his platoon commander and chose to act as rear man. Mendez continued to shield his lieutenant with his own body until he was mortally wounded. Mendez was posthumously awarded the Navy Cross and promoted to sergeant.

Postscript:

In March 1967, Mendez's body was sent to Puerto Rico for funeral services upon the request of his father. Mendez's siblings believed that their brother should be buried in New York and two weeks later, his body was sent to Staten Island where he was buried with full military honors on the grounds of the mission where he grew up at Mount Loretto. He was survived by his parents and his siblings, Ismael, Edwin, Carmen, Anibal, Maria, Betty and Anthony. The name of Angel Mendez is inscribed on the Vietnam Veterans Memorial ("The Wall") on Panel 16E – Line 94.

Senator Charles Schumer, senior U.S. Senator from the state of New York prompted by the men of the Island's Marine Corps League detachment and supported by the man whom Mendez saved, the Honorable Ronald D. Castille, former district attorney of Philadelphia and now Chief Justice of Pennsylvania, are calling for Mendez to be recognized with the highest military honor of the United States, the Medal of Honor.
 
The request lacked some vital information and in 2003, a meeting was held in Mt. Loretto, by Mr. Al Richichi, President and the Board of managers of the Mt. Loretto Alumni Association, Bruce W. Barraclough, Sr., John C. Gallo and Ismael Mendez and his wife Aida Mendez next of kin to Angel Mendez. This meeting was held to bring those involved up to date on the intentions of Barraclough and Gallo quest to honor Angel Mendez, and to get the family's permission to submit a new request for the Medal of Honor. In October, 2003 Barraclough and Gallo had finished writing up the new request which had presented only the facts, and added a petition signed by many organizations, Society's, along with many signatures from Staten Island, New Yorkers.

On January 14, 2008, the Honorable Ronald D. Castille was sworn in as Chief Justice of Pennsylvania. In his speech he is quoted as saying the following:

On May 26, 2008 during the Memorial Day celebrations held in San Juan, Puerto Rico, the inscription of the name of Angel Mendez in "El Monumento de la Recordación" (Monument of Remembrance) was unveiled. The monument is dedicated to Puerto Rico's fallen military members and situated in front of the Capitol Building. The unveiling was done by then Puerto Rico Senate President Kenneth McClintock and PR National Guard Adjutant General Col. David Carrión.

A bill (H.R. 2422), that would permit the naming of a Staten Island Post Office, located at 45 Bay Street, after Mendez was approved by the US House of Representatives on November 14, 2011. The bill was introduced by US Congressman Michael G. Grimm, representative of New York's 13th District, and cosponsored by every House member of the New York congressional delegation. The Bill was signed off on legislation by President Obama and the St. George Post Office was renamed and will be known as the "Sergeant Angel Mendez Post Office."

José L. Rivera
Lance Corporal José L. Rivera born in Ciales, Puerto Rico, was a member of the United States Marine Corps. He belonged to Company L, Third Battalion, 5th Marines, 1st Marine Division (Reinforced), Fleet Marine Force. His parents moved from Puerto Rico to the United States and settled in Waukegan, Illinois. When the enemy forces threw a grenade at his position, he covered it with his helmet and smothered the explosion with his own body, thereby saving the lives of his comrades.   
 
Navy Cross Citation:

Postscript:

Miguel Rivera-Sotomayor
Corporal Miguel Rivera-Sotomayor born in Philadelphia, Pennsylvania. to Puerto Rican parents, was a member of the United States Marine Corps. He belonged to Company F, 2nd Battalion, 9th Marines, 3rd Marine Division. Silenced enemy machine guns and allowed his platoon to move from its pinned down position to establish an effective base of fire against the enemy.

Navy Cross Citation:

Postscript:

El Monumento de la Recordación

The names of the Navy Cross recipients who perished in combat are inscribed in Puerto Rico's "El Monumento de la Recordacion" (Monument of Remembrance). The monument is dedicated to the Puerto Ricans (both those who were born in the island and/or those who were born elsewhere, but are of Puerto Rican descent) who have fallen in combat as members of the Armed Forces of the United States. The monument is located in front of the Capitol Building of Puerto Rico in San Juan.

See also

List of Puerto Ricans-Military
Puerto Rican recipients of the Medal of Honor
Puerto Rican recipients of the Distinguished Service Cross
Navy Cross
El Grito de Lares
Intentona de Yauco
List of Puerto Ricans
List of Puerto Rican military personnel
Military history of Puerto Rico
Puerto Rican Campaign
Puerto Ricans in World War I
Puerto Ricans in World War II
Puerto Ricans in the Vietnam War
Puerto Ricans Missing in Action - Korean War
Puerto Ricans Missing in Action - Vietnam War
Puerto Rican Nationalist Party Revolts of the 1950s
Puerto Rican women in the military
65th Infantry Regiment
Puerto Rican recipients of the Presidential Medal of Freedom
Puerto Rican recipients of the Presidential Citizens Medal

Notes
 N.B. An asterisk after the name indicates that the award was given posthumously.

References

Further reading
Puertorriquenos Who Served With Guts, Glory, and Honor. Fighting to Defend a Nation Not Completely Their Own; by : Greg Boudonck; 
Historia militar de Puerto Rico; by: Hector Andres Negroni; publisher=Sociedad Estatal Quinto Centenario (1992);

External links
Puerto Rico Hometown Heroes

Puerto Rican United States Marines
Recipients of the Navy Cross (United States)
Puerto Rico-related lists
Military in Puerto Rico